Christian Eggen Rismark (born 1 August 1991) is a Norwegian professional footballer who plays as a defender for Ranheim.

Career
Eggen Rismark started his career at Ranheim as a junior, he then moved to Strindheim in 2010. After one season in Strindheim, he then moved to local club Nardo in 2012. He moved to Ranheim in 2013. In 2015 he moved on loan to Tillerbyen, he then moved to Orkla on loan for the rest of 2015 season. In August 2018 Eggen Rismark went to Brann on a three-year contract.

Eggen Rismark made his debut for Ranheim in a 1–0 win against KIL/Hemne in the Norwegian Cup.

Personal life
Eggen Rismark is the grandchild of former Rosenborg coach Nils Arne Eggen.

Career statistics

Club

References

1991 births
Living people
Footballers from Trondheim
Norwegian footballers
Association football defenders
Eliteserien players
Norwegian First Division players
Norwegian Third Division players
Strindheim IL players
Ranheim Fotball players
SK Brann players